ALRA may refer to:
 Academy of Live and Recorded Arts, British drama school
Aboriginal Land Rights Act 1976, Australia
Abortion Law Reform Association, now Abortion Rights (organisation), British campaign group
 American Land Rights Association, private property rights advocacy organization